"Long Tall Glasses (I Can Dance)" is a 1974 song by Leo Sayer, co-written with David Courtney.  It was released in the United Kingdom in late 1974, becoming Sayer's third hit record on both the British and Irish singles charts and reaching number four in both nations. It was included on Sayer's album Just a Boy.

The song also became a Top 10 hit internationally in early 1975, reaching #7 in Australia and #9 in the United States. It had a lesser showing in Canada (#18), where a competing version had also been released.

Shooter version
A cover of the song ("I Can Dance") by the Canadian band Shooter, released concurrently with Sayer's version, became a hit in Canada. Their version reached #22, debuting on the charts the same week as Sayer's version.

Chart history

Weekly charts

Year-end charts

Leo Sayer

Shooter cover

References

External links
 

Leo Sayer songs
1974 songs
1974 singles
1975 singles
Chrysalis Records singles
Warner Records singles
Songs written by Leo Sayer
Songs written by David Courtney